Riley Gunnels (born August 24, 1937) is a former professional American football player who played defensive end for seven seasons for the Philadelphia Eagles and Pittsburgh Steelers. He played his high school football in the late 1950s at Calhoun High School in Calhoun, Georgia, where he grew up.

References

1937 births
Living people
American football defensive ends
Georgia Bulldogs football players
Philadelphia Eagles players
Pittsburgh Steelers players
People from Calhoun, Georgia
Players of American football from Atlanta

Calhoun High School alumni